This is a list of ambassadors from Jordan

Nazzal al-Armouti
Hussein Majali
Ahmad Masa'deh
Hasan Abu Nimah
Hazem Nuseibeh
Makram Mustafa Queisi
Abdelmunim Al-Rifai
Hani Bahjat Tabbara
 Nabil Talhouni
 Khaldoun Talhouni
 Adnan Talhouni
 Bahjat Talhouni
 Tharwat Talhouni
Umayya Toukan
Amjad Al Qhaiwi

 
Lists of Jordanian people by occupation
Jordan